Kanisi is one of the 23 Tahasils in Ganjam district in the Indian state of Odisha.

References 

Villages in Ganjam district